Genlisea is a genus of carnivorous plants also known as corkscrew plants.  The 30 or so species grow in wet terrestrial to semi-aquatic environments distributed throughout Africa and Central and South America. The plants use highly modified underground leaves to attract, trap and digest minute microfauna, particularly protozoans.  Although suggested a century earlier by Charles Darwin, carnivory in the genus was not proven until 1998.

The generic name Genlisea honors the French writer and educator Stéphanie Félicité Ducrest de St-Albin, comtesse de Genlis.

Several species in the genus, including G. margaretae, G. aurea, and G. tuberosa, possess the smallest known genomes of all flowering plants.

As stated, Genlisea has a wide range of genetic diversity which can be shown in various phenotypic traits. For example, G. tuberosa develops tubers, 1-3 occurring per plant. This allows for carbohydrate and water storage as it is found in areas prone to fire. Other species present with a thickened stolon.

Description

Genlisea are small herbs, growing from a slender rhizome and bearing two morphologically distinct leaf types - photosynthetic foliage leaves aboveground and highly modified subterranean leaves used to trap prey. The plants lack roots, although the subterranean traps perform many of the functions normally performed by roots, such as anchorage and absorption of water and nutrients.

Several to many flowers are held by a slender, erect, and often tall inflorescence. As in other members of the bladderwort family, the corolla is fused into a bilobed tube tapering to a spur, with the lower lip of the corolla having three lobes. The calyx is five-lobed, in contrast to Utricularia's three-lobed calyx.  Corolla colors are generally yellow or violet to mauve, although a few species are white or cream. The lower lip forms a palate that functions as the guide to the spur that contains the nectar by providing olfactory and mechanical stimuli for nearby pollinators like bees and flies. At a microscopic level, the palate has glandular trichomes, which are small hairs that store and secrete secondary metabolites in order to provide protection from herbivory. The glandular trichomes contain no nectar secretion, suggesting that they are scent glands. These above ground structures are not shown to be directly participating in carnivorous activities.

Depending on species, the photosynthetic leaves are linear to spatulate in shape and 0.5–5 cm (–2 in) in length.

The subterranean traps are white, lacking chlorophyll or any other pigmentation. They consist of a cylindrical stalk, widening at some distance below the surface into a hollow bulb-like utricle, and continuing as a hollow cylinder some further distance. At this point the stalk bifurcates into two furrowed spirals, between which the cylinder opening acts as the trap entrance. The furrows of the spiraled trap arms are lined with hairs pointing inward and toward the bifurcation. The hollow cylinder section leading from the bifurcation to the utricle is likewise lined with upward-pointing curved hairs. Some species produce two trap forms, one shorter and one longer, which probably target different prey groups. These corkscrew-like structures passively capture protozoa and other metazoan. Since these traps occur in soil, they are continuously stimulated due to the vast microfauna found in the soil. Due to continuous stimulation, the plant actively secretes digestive enzymes in order to aid with digestion to gain more nitrogen, phosphorus, and other minerals. Phosphatase has been detected in all types of glands, allowing for the breakdown of prey and uptake of phosphorus in low-nutrient soils. Although not completely understood, the oxygen concentration inside Genlisea traps is negligible. For this reason, it is thought that anoxic conditions could be the mechanisms in which prey are killed. At the same time, anaerobic bacteria survive.

Taxonomy
Twenty-nine species are currently recognised in the genus. Two varieties are also considered valid: G. aurea var. minor and the autonymous G. aurea var. aurea. Intraspecific determination depends almost wholly upon the inflorescence, particularly upon the indumentum. Genetic variation is an interesting area of attention as it has an incredible high rate of nucleotide substitution rates across nucleus, chloroplast, and mitochondria when compared to other angiosperms. Due to a mutation leading to changes in phenotypic traits found in the mitochondria, reactive oxygen species are produced which ultimately lead to DNA damage and further mutations.

Botanical history
The genus was discovered by Augustin François César Prouvençal de Saint-Hilaire, who in 1833 described four species: G. aurea, G. filiformis, G. pygmaea, and G. violacea.

Genome size range
The genus has a 25-fold range in genome size among its species and notably includes some of the smallest known plant genomes. For example, the genome of  G. nigrocaulis  is 86 Mbp (1C; 2n = 40) while that of its close relative G. hispidula (1C; 2n = 40) is 1550 Mbp, 18-fold larger. More than one genome size has been measured in G. aurea and G. repens, suggesting that di- and tetraploid individuals exist.

Host-Microbiome Interactions 
Genlisea traps host a microbe community of bacteria (dominant species consisting of anaerobic clostridium sp. and pectolytic dickeya sp.), green algae, microbial fungi, protists of SAR group, and minute metazoans. Through extensive research, the trap's bacterial community has been discovered as serving the ecological importance of being prey due to Genlisea plants relying on the digestive enzymatic systems from microbes in order to aid their own carnivorous digestion.

References

External links

The Carnivorous Plant Society Full Carnivorous plant list.

 
Lamiales genera